Justin L. Mercier (born June 25, 1987) is an American former professional ice hockey left wing who played in the National Hockey League with the Colorado Avalanche.

Playing career

Amateur
Mercier was drafted 168th overall in the 2005 NHL Entry Draft by the Colorado Avalanche. Mercier was drafted from the United States National Development Team Program after previously playing with the St. Louis Heartland Eagles in the USHL.

Mercier committed to Miami University in the summer of 2004, and after recording 10 points in his freshman year, Mercier developed into an aggressive scoring forward in the following years for Miami. As a senior Mercier was named the West regional MVP as he helped guide the Redhawks to the Frozen Four, losing the 2008–09 National Championship game 4–3 in overtime to Boston University.

Professional
On July 10, 2009, Mercier was signed to a three-year entry level contract with the Colorado Avalanche. Mercier was then assigned to the Avalanche's AHL affiliate, the Lake Erie Monsters, to start his first professional season in 2009–10. Expected to provide an energetic, physical presence, Mercier got off to a slow start recording a single assist in 24 games with Lake Erie before he was surprisingly recalled to the Avalanche on December 8, 2009. He made his NHL debut the next night in a 1–0 loss to the Minnesota Wild on December 9, 2009. Mercier returned to his Native Erie and on the turn of the year finally scored his first professional goals in a 3–2 win over the Hamilton Bulldogs on January 2, 2010. In his second recall to the Avalanche, Justin scored his first NHL goal in a 5–3 loss to the Nashville Predators on February 4, 2010.

In the following two seasons, Mercier became a fixture among the Monsters as a two-way checking line forward. Without a recall to the Avalanche, Mercier improved his goal totals with the Monsters each season and after his three-year tenure became Lake Erie's All-time games leader with 220.

Without an offer of an extension with the Avalanche and uncertainty due to the 2012 NHL lockout, Mercier was without a club going into the 2012–13 season. Two months into the season proper on October 28, 2012, Mercier was invited to train and try-out with German club EHC Wolfsburg of the DEL. On October 31, Mercier made his debut for the Grizzly Adams in front of the Wolfsburg fans in a 5–3 defeat to ERC Ingolstadt. Mercier struggled to translate his game offensively, but in a checking role contributed with 5 points in 35 games.

Mercier returned to North America in the off-season and belatedly signed a one-year contract in the ECHL with the Idaho Steelheads on October 7, 2013. In the 2013–14 season, Mercier appeared in 43 games with the Steelheads to post 18 goals and 30 points. His impact with the Steelheads was diminished as he was loaned on two separate occasions to AHL clubs, the Iowa Wild and the  Bridgeport Sound Tigers.

On August 19, 2014, Mercier continued in the ECHL, signing to a one-year contract with the Toledo Walleye. Mercier regained his scoring touch in accumulating 43 points in 46 games with the Walleye. He was loaned to AHL club, the Rochester Americans during the 2014–15 season, appearing in 16 games for 4 points before he returned to the Walleye.

As a free agent on August 6, 2015, Mercier returned for a second stint in Europe in joining former Walleye teammate, Shane Sims, in signing a one-year contract with Italian club, HC Gherdëina of the Italian Serie A.

International play

Apart of the U.S. development program, Mercier was named to the United States Team for the 2005 U18 World Championships. Far from the most skilled player, he was praised for his tenacity and tireless work as he recorded 1 assist in 6 games helping the U.S. capture Gold. In the gold medal game, a 5–1 victory over Canada, Mercier gained notoriety when he was assessed a match penalty and ejected in the third period following a dangerous hit along the boards against Colton Yellow Horn.

Career statistics

Regular season and playoffs

International

References

External links 

1987 births
Living people
American expatriate ice hockey players in Germany
American men's ice hockey left wingers
Bridgeport Sound Tigers players
Colorado Avalanche draft picks
Colorado Avalanche players
Ice hockey players from Pennsylvania
Idaho Steelheads (ECHL) players
Iowa Wild players
Lake Erie Monsters players
Miami RedHawks men's ice hockey players
Sportspeople from Erie, Pennsylvania
Rochester Americans players
St. Louis Heartland Eagles players
Toledo Walleye players
USA Hockey National Team Development Program players
Grizzlys Wolfsburg players
American expatriate ice hockey players in Italy